The Best of Poul Anderson is a collection of writings by American science fiction and fantasy author Poul Anderson, first published in paperback by Pocket Books in August 1976. It was reprinted in August 1979. The pieces were originally published between 1953 and 1970 in the magazines Astounding Science Fiction, Analog, Galaxy Magazine, and The Magazine of Fantasy and Science Fiction, and the anthology The Farthest Reaches.

The book contains nine novellas, novelettes and short stories, together with an introduction by fellow science fiction writer Barry N. Malzberg and a second, general introduction and introductory notes on the individual stories by the author.

Contents
"Recollecting Anderson" (Barry N. Malzberg)
"Introduction"
"The Longest Voyage"
"The Barbarian"
"The Last of the Deliverers"
"My Object All Sublime"
"Sam Hall"
"Kyrie"
"The Fatal Fulfillment"
"Hiding Place"
"The Sky People"

References

1976 short story collections
Short story collections by Poul Anderson
Pocket Books books